Nangana may refer to:

Nangana, Mozambique
Nangana, Victoria, Australia